Media Puzzle (May 7, 1997 – June 22, 2006), foaled in the United States was an Irish horse best known for his win in the 2002 Melbourne Cup.

Background
Media Puzzle was bred by Walter Haefner's Moyglare Stud Farm and owned by Dr. M. W. Smurfit. He was sired by Theatrical, the 1987 U.S. Champion Male Turf Horse, and out of the mare Market Slide by Gulch, the 1988 U.S. Champion Sprint Horse. Media Puzzle is the half brother of Refuse to Bend, a four-time group 1 winning entire by Sadler's Wells.

Racing career
At age three, Media Puzzle's best showings were third-place finishes in the Gallinule and St. Leger Stakes.

Plagued by tendon problems throughout his career, after a difficult 2001, Media Puzzle had his best year in 2002. Taken to Australia, his winning time of 2.25.90 in the 2400-metre Geelong Cup broke the course record for the race. He went on to win the 2002 Melbourne Cup with Damien Oliver on board. Oliver's brother Jason had died one week before the Melbourne Cup win in 2002.

Death
Media Puzzle was put down after shattering a leg at the Ascot Gold Cup.

See also
 2002 Melbourne Cup
 List of millionaire racehorses in Australia
 List of Melbourne Cup winners

References

Notes

Bibliography

External links
 Media Puzzle's pedigree and partial racing stats
 Photos by Quentin J. Lang of Media Puzzle and his 2002 Melbourne Cup win

1997 racehorse births
2006 racehorse deaths
Horses who died from racing injuries
Racehorses bred in Kentucky
Racehorses trained in Ireland
Melbourne Cup winners
Thoroughbred family 10-a